Janet Elizabeth Courtney  (born Barton-upon-Humber, 27 November 1865; died London, 24 September 1954) was an English scholar, writer and feminist.

Early life
She was a daughter of the Revd George Hogarth and Jane Elizabeth Uppleby;  sister of the archaeologist David George Hogarth. She was educated at Lady Margaret Hall, Oxford, 1885-1888 and was awarded a first class degree in Philosophy. Philosophy was still a male-dominated subject when Hogarth wished to study it, so that she was forced to petition the men's lecture courses for access. Benjamin Jowett agreed to allow her to join classes at Balliol College, where she joined lectures on the pre-Socratics given by Richard Lewis Nettleship. She had to sit at the High Table, away from the audience of male undergraduates, and was sometimes accompanied by Elizabeth Wordsworth as a chaperone, who could be heard disagreeing with the lecturer. Following the Nettleship lecturers New College gave permission for Hogarth to attend lectures on Plato given by William Leonard Courtney, who would support her education by interceding with other lectures on her behalf, and later become her husband.

Professional life
She first had a part-time teaching post at Cheltenham Ladies' College, then worked as a clerk for the Royal Commission on Labour, 1892–94; was the first superintendent of women clerks of the Bank of England, 1894-1906; Librarian of The Times Book Club, 1906-1910; and on the editorial staff of the Encyclopædia Britannica 1906-1914 and 1920-22. She was joint-editor for indexing of the 11th and 12th editions and contributed 700 of the shorter biographies for the former and signed articles on women to the latter.

In 1911 she married William Leonard Courtney, editor of the Fortnightly Review and chief dramatic critic and literary editor of the Daily Telegraph.

She was adviser on staff welfare to the Ministry of Munitions 1916-1917 and in the latter year was awarded an OBE. She was also a JP. She was a board member of the executive committee of the Carnegie United Kingdom Trust from 1913. Following the death of her husband in 1928 she became acting editor of the Fortnightly Review from November 1928 to June 1929.

She was the author of a number of books of aspects of feminism as well as several volumes of reminiscences that contain valuable insights into her working life at the Bank of England, The Times and the Encyclopædia Britannica.

Written works
As Janet Hogarth

The Modern French Drama. Seven essays ... 1898, Translated by J. E. Hogarth.
 The Woman's Library 1903 In Vol. 1. "Education and professions: The higher education of women" 
 
As Janet E. Courtney

Pillars of Empire (with W. L. Courtney), 1918
Freethinkers of the nineteenth century, 1920
The making of an editor, 1930 (A biography of her husband)
Recollected in Tranquility, 1930
An Oxford Portrait Gallery, 1931
Countrywomen in Council, 1933 ( A study of the Women's Institutes)
The Adventurous Thirties, 1933 (Prominent women of the 1830s)
The Women of my Time, 1934
Simple Annals, 1936

References

 Who was Who, 1951–60, p 246
 British Library on-line catalogue.
 G. Thomas, A Position to Command Respect:women and the eleventh Britannica, (1992)
 Gillian Thomas, Hogarth, Janet Elizabeth (1865-1954), Oxford Dictionary of National Biography, 2004

1865 births
1954 deaths
English non-fiction writers
Alumni of Lady Margaret Hall, Oxford
People from Barton-upon-Humber
Officers of the Order of the British Empire
English justices of the peace